Ahungalla is a small coastal town, located in Galle District, Southern Province, Sri Lanka, governed by an Urban Council.

History
Ahungalla is known primarily for its sandy beach, accompanied by a wide palm belt, considered to be one of the best on the island.

The neighboring villages are Kosgoda to the north and Balapitiya in the south. Southeast of the town is the mangrove area of Madu Ganga.

The largest and most well-known building in the town is the luxury hotel, Heritance Ahungalla (formerly Hotel Triton), designed by notable Sri Lankan architect, Geoffrey Bawa, and constructed from 1979 to 1981.

As with the entire region Ahungalla was devastated by the tsunami caused by the 2004 Indian Ocean earthquake.

Transport
Ahungalla is located on the Coastal or Southern Rail Line (connecting Colombo through to Matara), and the A2 highway, connecting Colombo to Wellawaya.

Facilities
 Ahungalla railway station - few trains however stop at this station
 Rajapaksha College

Attractions
 Ahungalla beach

See also
 List of beaches in Sri Lanka

References

Populated places in Galle District
Populated places in Southern Province, Sri Lanka
Seaside resorts in Sri Lanka